Conalia melanops is a beetle in the genus Conalia of the family Mordellidae. It was described in 1946 by Ray.

References

Mordellidae
Beetles described in 1946